Synteratus ovalis is a species of beetle in the family Carabidae, the only species in the genus Synteratus.

References

Trechinae